Juvenil Reyes Bata  is an Equatoguinean football club based in the city of Bata, Equatorial Guinea. The club has played many season in Equatoguinean Premier League.

Performance in CAF competitions
CAF Champions League: 2 appearances
1986 African Cup of Champions Clubs – First Round
1987 African Cup of Champions Clubs – First Round

Stadium
Currently the team plays at the 22,000 capacity Estadio de Bata.

References

External links
De.wikipedia Profile

Football clubs in Equatorial Guinea